The Matsiatra is a river in Haute Matsiatra region, is located in central and western Madagascar. It flows into the Mangoky River. 

Together with the Mananantanana, it forms the Mangoky River.

References 

Rivers of Madagascar
Rivers of Haute Matsiatra